The 1949 Detroit Tigers season was a season in American baseball. The team finished fourth in the American League with a record of 87–67, 10 games behind the New York Yankees.

Offseason 
 November 10, 1948: Marv Grissom was drafted by the Tigers from the Sacramento Solons in the 1948 rule 5 draft.

Regular season 
Tigers third baseman George Kell beat Ted Williams of the Boston Red Sox for the American League batting title by 0.0002 percentage points (.3429 to .3427).

Season standings

Record vs. opponents

Roster

Player stats

Batting

Starters by position 
Note: Pos = Position; G = Games played; AB = At bats; H = Hits; Avg. = Batting average; HR = Home runs; RBI = Runs batted in

Other batters 
Note: G = Games played; AB = At bats; H = Hits; Avg. = Batting average; HR = Home runs; RBI = Runs batted in

Pitching

Starting pitchers 
Note: G = Games pitched; IP = Innings pitched; W = Wins; L = Losses; ERA = Earned run average; SO = Strikeouts

Other pitchers 
Note: G = Games pitched; IP = Innings pitched; W = Wins; L = Losses; ERA = Earned run average; SO = Strikeouts

Relief pitchers 
Note: G = Games pitched; W = Wins; L = Losses; SV = Saves; ERA = Earned run average; SO = Strikeouts

Awards and honors 
 George Kell, AL Batting champion

Farm system 

Lynn franchise folded, July 19, 1949

Notes

References 

1949 Detroit Tigers season at Baseball Reference

Detroit Tigers seasons
Detroit Tigers season
Detroit Tigers
1949 in Detroit